Gerasimus I served as Greek Patriarch of Alexandria between 1620 and 1636.

References

17th-century Greek Patriarchs of Alexandria
17th-century people from the Ottoman Empire